Brand-new idol Society is the debut album by Japanese idol group BiS released through the independent label Tsubasa Records on March 23, 2011. The album is the first physical release by the group, being preceded by the free digital single "Taiyou no Jumon". It is also the only full album to feature the original lineup, as Rina Yokoyama would leave the group in June 2011.

Track listing

Personnel
BiS
Pour Lui – vocals; Lyrics on Tracks 1 and 12
Nozomi Hirano – vocals
Rina Yokoyama - vocals
Yukiko Nakayama - vocals; Lyrics on Track 10
Kenta Matsukuma - Sound producer; Guitar on Tracks 1, 5, 7, 8 and 12; Programming on Tracks 1, 2, 5 and 7
Ichiro Iguchi - Guitar on Tracks 11 and 13; Programming on Tracks 11 and 13
Masahiro Inzuka - Guitar on Track 2
Satoshi Aoki - Guitar on Track 4
ke-san - Guitar on Track 6
TKC - Guitar on Tracks 10
Keita Kitajima - Bass guitar on Track 1
Tabokun - Bass guitar on Track 2
megane - Bass guitar on Tracks 6 and 13
Asahi Yanagihara - Bass guitar on Tracks 11 and 12
Takashi Todoroki - Drums on Tracks 1, 2, 5, 6, 7, 11 and 12
Akihiko - Drums on Track 13
Yuki Yokoyama (Schtein&Longer) - Programming on Tracks 3, 4, 8, 9 and 10
Shota Kamii - Brass Arrangement on Tracks 3 and 9; Sax on Tracks 3, 8 and 9
Shun Yonehara - Trumpet on Tracks 3 and 9
Daisuke Moriwaki - Programming, Strings Arrangement, Violin & Violas on Track 12
Hikaru Yamaguchi - Executive Producer

Notes
All writing, arrangement and personnel credits taken from the album insert.
Track 8, "Elegant no Kaibutsu", is a cover of the song by SPANK HAPPY.
Track 12, "One day", is a cover of the song by Pour Lui. 
Track 6, "let me sleep", is a song originally performed by Pour Lui during her time as a solo artist. However, this album is the first and only time a recording of the song has been released.

References

2011 debut albums
Bis (Japanese idol group) albums